The yellow garden eel (Heteroconger luteolus) is an eel in the family Congridae (conger/garden eels). It was described by David G. Smith in 1989. It is a nonmigratory marine, tropical eel which is endemic to waters off the coast of the U.S. state of Florida. It is known from the both sides of Florida, from the Gulf of Mexico to the western central Atlantic Ocean.

References

External links
 

Heteroconger
Fish described in 1989
Fish of the Atlantic Ocean

Endemic fauna of Florida